Love $ Greed is a 1991 romantic comedy directed by Bashar Shbib.

Synopsis

Robert and Alexandra have been divorced for some time. They are surprised to find out that Robert's uncle, Leopold, has left them an inheritance of $23 million on one condition: within a year, Robert and Alexandra must have a child. Although they have each remarried, they are drawn together by greed.

Cast

Robert : Franck Bruynbroek
Alexandra : Melissa White
Suzie : Lori Eastside
Ted : Dick Monday
Bernie : David Charles

Distribution and critical reception 

Love $ Greed was presented as an official entry at the Montreal World Film Festival competition.
This second American production for Bashar Shbib was less appreciated by some Quebec critics than his previous one, Julia Has Two Lovers.
Nevertheless, Love $ Greed was still distributed in about fifty countries.
Suzan Ayscough in Variety wrote "...a funny movie about lust, love and greed... (Melissa) White is a natural."
Héléne de Billy in L'actualité described it as "...une histoire abracadabrante..." (...an abracadabra story...).
Writing in La Presse Serge Dussault called it "Du gros rire...” ( Big laughs...).

References

External links 
 

1991 films
English-language Canadian films
1991 romantic comedy films
American romantic comedy films
Films directed by Bashar Shbib
Canadian romantic comedy films
1990s English-language films
1990s American films
1990s Canadian films